Shane Bitney Crone (born December 19, 1985) is an American filmmaker, writer, speaker, and advocate for LGBT rights.

Early life
Crone was born in Kalispell, Montana. He moved to Los Angeles after high school graduation.

"It Could Happen to You"
Crone made headlines in May 2012 when he released a video on YouTube titled "It Could Happen to You," in which he spoke of the devastation he faced after the unexpected death of his longtime life partner, Tom Bridegroom (Born: April 22, 1982, Knox, Indiana; Died: May 7, 2011, Los Angeles, California), a year earlier. Bridegroom was an actor and songwriter who hosted the TV series The X Effect. While Crone's own family was loving and accepting of his sexual orientation, Bridegroom's family was not, and had gone so far as to threaten Tom with physical violence and to blame Crone for "making" Tom gay. After Bridegroom accidentally fell to his death while photographing his friend Alexandra Grossi on the roof of her four-story apartment building in the Silverlake-Los Feliz neighborhood of Los Angeles, Crone was threatened with physical violence if he attended Bridegroom's funeral and was not mentioned in Bridegroom's obituary or memorial service. Crone had also been denied hospital visitations and other rights accorded married couples because he was not recognized as Bridegroom's partner or as family.

Crone's emotional plea for rights for same-sex couples became one of the most widely viewed clips on YouTube shortly after its release. Crone was stunned and gratified by the reception to his video, and told RadarOnline.com that he made the video as a form of therapy to help him deal with his loss and to further positive change for same-sex couples in the United States.

Bridegroom

Bridegroom, a documentary directed by Linda Bloodworth-Thomason, based on the story of Crone's and Bridegroom's relationship and the difficulties Crone faced after his partner's death, premiered on April 23, 2013, at the Tribeca Film Festival. Bridegroom was endorsed by former President Bill Clinton, who introduced the documentary at the Tribeca Film Festival. In his remarks, Clinton stated, "This is really, on one level, a wonderful, sad, heartbreaking yet exhilarating and life-affirming story ... and on another level, it's a story about our nation's struggle to make one more step in forming a more perfect union, for which marriage is both the symbol and substance." Bridegroom won the Tribeca Film Festival Audience's non-fiction award.

Personal life
On February 15, 2016, Crone announced that he is in a relationship with American Idol finalist Rayvon Owen. He is also featured as the romantic lead in Owen's music video "Can't Fight It". They announced on 3 March 2018 that they would be getting married, after Crone proposed to Owen on stage at a Demi Lovato concert.

References

External links

Celebrity Premiere
Official Facebook Fan Page

Bridegroom movie official website

1985 births
21st-century American male actors
21st-century American writers
Activists from California
American filmmakers
American male film actors
American male television actors
American gay actors
American gay writers
LGBT people from California
LGBT people from Montana
American LGBT rights activists
Living people
Male actors from Montana
Male actors from Los Angeles
People from Kalispell, Montana
Writers from Los Angeles
Writers from Montana